This is a list of communities in Wales sorted by principal area. The 'community' is the lowest tier of local government in Wales, and is usually represented by a community council. A Welsh community is broadly equivalent to an English civil parish. In total, Wales is divided into 878 communities, of which about 768 (87%) are represented by community councils.

Blaenau Gwent

 Abertillery 
 Badminton  
 Beaufort 
 Brynmawr (town) 
 Cwm 
 Ebbw Vale North  
 Ebbw Vale South  
 Garnlydan
 Llanhilleth 
 Nantyglo and Blaina (town) 
 Rassau  
 Tredegar (town)

Former communities

 Ebbw Vale

Bridgend

 Brackla 
 Bridgend (town) 
 Cefn Cribwr 
 Coity Higher 
 Cornelly 
 Coychurch Higher 
 Coychurch Lower 
 Garw Valley 
 Laleston 
 Llangynwyd Lower 
 Llangynwyd Middle 
 Maesteg (town) 
 Merthyr Mawr 
 Newcastle Higher 
 Ogmore Valley 
 Pencoed (town) 
 Porthcawl (town) 
 Pyle 
 St Bride's Minor 
 Ynysawdre

Caerphilly

 Aber Valley 
 Abercarn 
 Argoed 
 Bargoed (town) 
 Bedwas, Trethomas and Machen 
 Blackwood (town) 
 Caerphilly (town) 
 Cefn Fforest 
 Crosskeys 
 Crumlin 
 Darran Valley 
 Gelligaer 
 Llanbradach and Pwllypant 
 Maesycwmmer 
 Nelson 
 New Tredegar 
 Newbridge 
 Pengam 
 Penmaen 
 Penyrheol, Trecenydd and Energlyn 
 Pontllanfraith 
 Rhymney 
 Risca East
 Risca Town
 Rudry 
 Van 
 Ynysddu

Cardiff

 Adamsdown 
 Butetown 
 Caerau 
 Canton 
 Castle 
 Cathays 
 Cyncoed 
 Ely 
 Fairwater 
 Gabalfa 
 Grangetown 
 Heath 
 Lisvane  - elects a community council.
 Llandaff 
 Llandaff North 
 Llanedeyrn  (created in 2016) 
 Llanishen 
 Llanrumney 
 Old St Mellons  - elects a community council.
 Pentwyn 
 Pentyrch  - elects a community council.
 Penylan
 Pontcanna (created in 2016)  
 Pontprennau 
 Radyr and Morganstown  - elects a community council.
 Rhiwbina 
 Riverside 
 Roath (formerly known as Plasnewydd) 
 Rumney 
 Splott (Tremorfa removed in 2016)  
 St Fagans  - elects a community council.
 Thornhill  (created in 2016)  
 Tongwynlais  - elects a community council.
 Tremorfa  (created in 2016)
 Trowbridge 
 Whitchurch

Carmarthenshire

 Abergwili 
 Abernant 
 Ammanford (town) 
 Betws 
 Bronwydd 
 Carmarthen (town) 
 Cenarth 
 Cilycwm 
 Cilymaenllwyd 
 Cwmamman (town) 
 Cynwyl Elfed 
 Cynwyl Gaeo 
 Dyffryn Cennen 
 Eglwyscummin 
 Gorslas 
 Henllanfallteg 
 Kidwelly (town)  – see Kidwelly Town Council
 Laugharne Township 
 Llanarthney 
 Llanboidy 
 Llanddarog 
 Llanddeusant 
 Llanddowror and Llanmiloe
 Llandeilo (town) 
 Llandovery (town) 
 Llandybie 
 Llandyfaelog 
 Llanedi 
 Llanegwad 
 Llanelli (town)  – see Llanelli Town Council
 Llanelli Rural  – see Llanelli Rural Council
 Llanfair-ar-y-bryn 
 Llanfihangel Aberbythych 
 Llanfihangel-ar-Arth 
 Llanfihangel Rhos-y-Corn 
 Llanfynydd 
 Llangadog 
 Llangain 
 Llangathen 
 Llangeler 
 Llangennech 
 Llangunnor 
 Llangyndeyrn 
 Llangynin 
 Llangynog 
 Llanllawddog 
 Llanllwni 
 Llannon 
 Llanpumsaint 
 Llansadwrn 
 Llansawel 
 Llansteffan and Llanybri
 Llanwinio 
 Llanwrda 
 Llanybydder 
 Llanycrwys 
 Manordeilo and Salem 
 Meidrim 
 Myddfai 
 Newcastle Emlyn (town) 
 Newchurch and Merthyr 
 Pembrey and Burry Port Town (town) 
 Pencarreg 
 Pendine 
 Pontyberem 
 Quarter Bach 
 St Clears (town) 
 St Ishmael 
 Talley 
 Trelech 
 Trimsaran 
 Whitland (town)

Ceredigion

 Aberaeron (town) 
 Aberporth 
 Aberystwyth (town)  – see also Aberystwyth Town Council
 Beulah 
 Blaenrheidol 
 Borth 
 Cardigan (town) 
 Ceulanamaesmawr 
 Ciliau Aeron 
 Dyffryn Arth 
 Faenor 
 Geneu'r Glyn 
 Henfynyw 
 Lampeter (town) 
 Llanarth 
 Lanbadarn Fawr 
 Llanddewi Brefi 
 Llandyfriog 
 Llandysiliogogo 
 Llandysul 
 Llanfair Clydogau 
 Llanfarian 
 Llanfihangel Ystrad 
 Llangeitho 
 Llangoedmor 
 Llangrannog 
 Llangwyryfon 
 Llangybi 
 Llangynfelyn 
 Llanilar 
 Llanllwchaiarn 
 Llanrhystyd 
 Llansantffraed
 Llanwenog 
 Llanwnnen 
 Lledrod 
 Melindwr 
 Nantcwnlle 
 New Quay (town) 
 Penbryn 
 Pontarfynach 
 Tirymynach 
 Trawsgoed 
 Trefeurig 
 Tregaron 
 Troedyraur 
 Y Ferwig 
 Ysbyty Ystwyth 
 Ysgubor-y-coed 
 Ystrad Fflur 
 Ystradmeurig

Conwy

 Abergele (town) 
 Betws-y-Coed 
 Betws yn Rhos 
 Bro Garmon 
 Bro Machno 
 Caerhun 
 Capel Curig 
 Cerrigydrudion 
 Colwyn Bay (town)  – see Bay of Colwyn Town Council
 Conwy (town)  - see Conwy Town Council
 Dolgarrog 
 Dolwyddelan 
 Eglwysbach 
 Henryd 
 Kinmel Bay and Towyn (town) 
 Llanddoged and Maenan 
 Llanddulas and Rhyd-y-foel 
 Llandudno (town) 
 Llanfair Talhaiarn 
 Llanfairfechan (town) 
 Llanfihangel Glyn Myfyr 
 Llangernyw 
 Llangwm 
 Llannefydd 
 Llanrwst (town) 
 Llansanffraid Glan Conwy 
 Llansannan 
 Llysfaen 
 Mochdre 
 Old Colwyn  – see Bay of Colwyn Town Council
 Penmaenmawr (town) 
 Pentrefoelas 
 Rhos-on-Sea  – see Bay of Colwyn Town Council
 Trefriw 
 Ysbyty Ifan

Denbighshire

 Aberwheeler 
 Betws Gwerfil Goch 
 Bodelwyddan 
 Bodfari 
 Bryneglwys 
 Cefn Meiriadog 
 Clocaenog 
 Corwen 
 Cwm 
 Cyffylliog 
 Cynwyd 
 Denbigh (town) 
 Derwen 
 Dyserth 
 Efenechtyd 
 Gwyddelwern 
 Henllan 
 Llanarmon-yn-Iâl 
 Llanbedr Dyffryn Clwyd 
 Llandegla 
 Llandrillo 
 Llandyrnog 
 Llanelidan 
 Llanfair Dyffryn Clwyd 
 Llanferres 
 Llangollen (town) 
 Llangynhafal 
 Llanrhaeadr-yng-Nghinmeirch 
 Llantysilio 
 Llanynys 
 Nantglyn 
 Prestatyn (town) 
 Rhuddlan (town) 
 Rhyl (town) 
 Ruthin (town) 
 St Asaph (city) 
 Trefnant 
 Tremeirchion 
 Waen

Flintshire

 Argoed 
 Bagillt 
 Broughton and Bretton 
 Brynford 
 Buckley (town) 
 Caerwys (town) 
 Cilcain 
 Connah's Quay (town) 
 Flint (town) 
 Gwernaffield with Pantymwyn 
 Gwernymynydd 
 Halkyn 
 Hawarden 
 Higher Kinnerton 
 Holywell (town) 
 Hope 
 Leeswood and Pontblyddyn 
 Llanasa 
 Llanfynydd 
 Mold (town) 
 Mostyn 
 Nannerch 
 Nercwys 
 Northop 
 Northop Hall 
 Penyffordd 
 Queensferry 
 Saltney (town) 
 Sealand (town) 
 Shotton (town) 
 Trelawnyd and Gwaenysgor 
 Treuddyn 
 Whitford 
 Ysceifiog

Gwynedd

 Aber 
 Aberdaron 
 Aberdovey 
 Arthog 
 Bala (town) 
 Bangor (city)  – see Bangor City Council
 Barmouth (town) 
 Beddgelert 
 Bethesda 
 Betws Garmon 
 Bontnewydd 
 Botwnnog 
 Brithdir and Llanfachreth 
 Bryn-crug 
 Buan 
 Caernarfon (royal town) 
 Clynnog 
 Corris 
 Criccieth (town) 
 Dolbenmaen 
 Dolgellau (town) 
 Dyffryn Ardudwy 
 Ffestiniog (town) 
 Ganllwyd 
 Harlech (town) 
 Llanaelhaearn 
 Llanbedr 
 Llanbedrog 
 Llanberis 
 Llanddeiniolen 
 Llandderfel 
 Llandwrog 
 Llandygai 
 Llanegryn 
 Llanelltyd 
 Llanengan 
 Llanfair 
 Llanfihangel-y-Pennant 
 Llanfrothen 
 Llangelynin 
 Llangywer 
 Llanllechid 
 Llanllyfni 
 Llannor 
 Llanrug 
 Llanuwchllyn 
 Llanwnda 
 Llanycil 
 Llanystumdwy 
 Maentwrog 
 Mawddwy 
 Nefyn (town) 
 Pennal 
 Penrhyndeudraeth (town) 
 Pentir 
 Pistyll 
 Porthmadog (town) 
 Pwllheli (town) 
 Talsarnau 
 Trawsfynydd 
 Tudweiliog 
 Tywyn (town) 
 Waunfawr 
 Y Felinheli

Isle of Anglesey

 Aberffraw 
 Amlwch (town) 
 Beaumaris (town) 
 Bodedern 
 Bodffordd 
 Bodorgan 
 Bryngwran 
 Cwm Cadnant 
 Cylch-y-Garn 
 Holyhead (town)  – see Holyhead Town Council
 Llanbadrig 
 Llanddaniel Fab 
 Llanddona 
 Llanddyfnan 
 Llaneilian 
 Llaneugrad 
 Llanfachraeth 
 Llanfaelog 
 Llanfaethlu 
 Llanfair-Mathafarn-Eithaf 
 Llanfair Pwllgwyngyll 
 Llanfair-yn-neubwll 
 Llanfihangel Ysgeifiog 
 Llangefni (town) 
 Llangoed 
 Llangristiolus 
 Llanidan 
 Llannerch-y-medd 
 Mechell 
 Menai Bridge (town) 
 Moelfre 
 Penmynydd 
 Pentraeth 
 Rhoscolyn 
 Rhosybol 
 Rhosyr 
 Trearddur 
 Tref Alaw 
 Trewalchmai 
 Valley

Merthyr Tydfil

 Bedlinog  - the only elected Community Council in the borough.
 Cyfarthfa 
 Dowlais 
 Gurnos 
 Merthyr Vale 
 Pant 
 Park 
 Penydarren 
 Town (Town) 
 Treharris 
 Troed-y-rhiw 
 Vaynor

Monmouthshire

 Abergavenny (town) 
 Caerwent 
 Caldicot (town) 
 Chepstow (town) 
 Crucorney 
 Devauden 
 Gobion Fawr
 Goetre Fawr 
 Grosmont 
 Llanarth 
 Llanbadoc 
 Llanelly 
 Llanfoist Fawr 
 Llangybi 
 Llantilio Pertholey 
 Llantrisant Fawr 
 Magor with Undy 
 Mathern 
 Mitchel Troy 
 Monmouth (town)  – see also Monmouth Town Council
 Portskewett 
 Raglan 
 Rogiet 
 Shirenewton 
 Skenfrith
 St Arvans 
 Trellech United 
 Usk (town) 
 Whitecastle
 Wye Valley

Former communities
 Gwehelog Fawr (until 2022) 
 Llangattock-Vibon-Avel 
 Llangwm (until 2022) 
 Llanhennock (until 2022) 
 Llantilio Crossenny

Neath Port Talbot

 Aberavon 
 Baglan 
 Baglan Bay 
 Baglan Moors
 Blaengwrach 
 Blaenhonddan 
 Briton Ferry (town) 
 Bryn 
 Cilybebyll 
 Clyne and Melincourt 
 Coedffranc 
 Crynant 
 Cwmafan 
 Cwmllynfell 
 Cymer and Glyncorrwg
 Dyffryn Clydach 
 Glynneath (town) 
 Gwaun-Cae-Gurwen 
 Gwynfi and Croeserw
 Margam 
 Margam Moors 
 Neath (town) 
 Onllwyn 
 Pelenna 
 Pontardawe (town) 
 Port Talbot 
 Resolven 
 Sandfields East 
 Sandfields West 
 Seven Sisters 
 Tai-Bach 
 Tonna 
 Ystalyfera

Former communities
 Glyncorrwg

Newport

 Allt-yr-yn 
 Alway 
 Beechwood 
 Bettws 
 Bishton 
 Caerleon 
 Coedkernew 
 Gaer 
 Goldcliff 
 Graig 
 Langstone 
 Llanvaches 
 Llanwern 
 Lliswerry 
 Malpas 
 Marshfield 
 Michaelston-y-Fedw 
 Nash 
 Penhow 
 Pillgwenlly 
 Redwick 
 Ringland 
 Rogerstone 
 Shaftesbury 
 St Julians 
 Stow Hill 
 Tredegar Park 
 Victoria 
 Wentlooge

Pembrokeshire

 Ambleston 
 Amroth 
 Angle 
 Boncath 
 Brawdy 
 Burton 
 Camrose 
 Carew 
 Cilgerran 
 Clunderwen
 Clydau 
 Cosheston 
 Crymych 
 Cwm Gwaun 
 Dale 
 Dinas Cross 
 East Williamston 
 Eglwyswrw 
 Fishguard and Goodwick (town) 
 Freystrop 
 Haverfordwest (town) 
 Hayscastle 
 Herbrandston 
 Hook
 Hundleton 
 Jeffreyston 
 Johnston 
 Kilgetty/Begelly 
 Lampeter Velfrey 
 Lamphey 
 Letterston 
 Llanddewi Velfrey 
 Llandissilio West 
 Llangwm 
 Llanrhian 
 Llanstadwell 
 Llawhaden 
 Maenclochog 
 Manorbier 
 Manordeifi 
 Marloes and St Brides 
 Martletwy 
 Mathry 
 Merlin's Bridge 
 Milford Haven (town) 
 Mynachlogddu
 Narberth (town) 
 Nevern 
 New Moat 
 Newport (town) 
 Neyland (town) 
 Nolton and Roch 
 Pembroke (town) 
 Pembroke Dock (town) 
 Penally 
 Pencaer 
 Puncheston 
 Rosemarket 
 Rudbaxton 
 Saundersfoot 
 Scleddau 
 Solva 
 Spittal 
 St David's and the Cathedral Close (city) 
 St Dogmaels 
 St Florence 
 St Ishmaels 
 St Mary Out Liberty 
 Stackpole and Castlemartin (from 3 May 2012) 
 Templeton 
 Tenby (town) 
 The Havens 
 Tiers Cross 
 Uzmaston, Boulston and Slebech (from 3 May 2012) 
 Walwyn's Castle 
 Wiston 
 Wolfscastle

Former communities
 Castlemartin (until 2 May 2012) 
 Slebech (until 2 May 2012) 
 Stackpole (until 2 May 2012) 
 Trecwn (until 2 May 2012) 
 Uzmaston and Boulston (until 2 May 2012)

Powys

 Abbey Cwmhir
 Aberedw 
 Aberhafesp 
 Abermule with Llandyssil
 Banwy 
 Bausley with Criggion 
 Beguildy 
 Berriew 
 Bettws 
 Brecon (town) 
 Bronllys 
 Builth (town) 
 Cadfarch 
 Caersws 
 Carno 
 Carreghofa 
 Castle Caereinion 
 Churchstoke 
 Cilmery 
 Clyro 
 Cray 
 Crickhowell (town) 
 Cwmdu and District
 Disserth and Trecoed 
 Duhonw 
 Dwyriw 
 Erwood 
 Felin-fach 
 Forden with Leighton and Trelystan 
 Gladestry 
 Glantwymyn 
 Glasbury 
 Glascwm 
 Glyn Tarell 
 Guilsfield 
 Gwernyfed 
 Hay (town) 
 Honddu Isaf 
 Kerry 
 Knighton (town) 
 Llanafanfawr 
 Llanbadarn Fawr 
 Llanbadarn Fynydd 
 Llanbister 
 Llanbrynmair 
 Llanddew 
 Llanddewi Ystradenny 
 Llandinam 
 Llandrindod Wells (town) 
 Llandrinio and Arddleen
 Llandysilio 
 Llanelwedd 
 Llanerfyl 
 Llanfair Caereinion 
 Llanfechain 
 Llanfihangel 
 Llanfihangel Rhydithon 
 Llanfrynach 
 Llanfyllin (town) 
 Llangamarch 
 Llangattock 
 Llangedwyn 
 Llangors 
 Llangunllo 
 Llangurig 
 Llangynidr 
 Llangyniew 
 Llangynog 
 Llanidloes (town) 
 Llanidloes Without 
 Llanigon 
 Llanrhaeadr-ym-Mochnant 
 Llansantffraed
 Llansilin 
 Llanwddyn 
 Llanwrthwl 
 Llanwrtyd Wells (town) 
 Llanyre 
 Llywel 
 Machynlleth (town) 
 Maescar 
 Manafon 
 Meifod 
 Merthyr Cynog 
 Mochdre with Penstrowed
 Montgomery (town) 
 Nantmel 
 New Radnor 
 Newtown and Llanllwchaiarn (town) 
 Old Radnor 
 Painscastle 
 Pen-y-Bont-Fawr 
 Penybont 
 Presteigne (town) 
 Rhayader (town) 
 St Harmon 
 Talgarth 
 Talybont-on-Usk 
 Tawe Uchaf 
 The Vale of Grwyney 
 Trallong 
 Trefeglwys 
 Treflys 
 Tregynon 
 Trewern 
 Welshpool (town) 
 Whitton 
 Yscir 
 Ystradfellte 
 Ystradgynlais (town)

Rhondda Cynon Taf

 Aberaman North (from 1 December 2016)  
 Aberaman South (from 1 December 2016)  
 Abercynon 
 Aberdare East (from 1 December 2016) 
 Aberdare West (from 1 December 2016) 
 Cwm Clydach 
 Cwmbach 
 Cymmer 
 Ferndale 
 Gilfach Goch 
 Hirwaun 
 Llanharan 
 Llanharry 
 Llantrisant 
 Llantwit Fardre 
 Llwydcoed 
 Llwyn-y-pia 
 Maerdy 
 Mountain Ash East (from 1 December 2016) 
 Mountain Ash West (from 1 December 2016) 
 Pen-y-graig 
 Penrhiw-ceiber
 Pentre 
 Pen-y-waun 
 Pont-y-clun 
 Pontypridd (town) 
 Porth 
 Rhigos 
 Taff's Well 
 Tonypandy 
 Tonyrefail 
 Trealaw 
 Trehafod 
 Treherbert 
 Treorchy 
 Tylorstown 
 Ynyshir 
 Ynysybwl and Coed-y-Cwm 
 Ystrad

Former communities
 Aberaman  
 Aberdare  
 Mountain Ash

Swansea

 Birchgrove 
 Bishopston 
 Bonymaen 
 Castle 
 Clydach 
 Cockett 
 Cwmbwrla 
 Dunvant 
 Gorseinon (town) 
 Gowerton 
 Grovesend and Waungron 
 Ilston 
 Killay 
 Landore 
 Llangennith, Llanmadoc and Cheriton 
 Llangyfelach 
 Llanrhidian Higher 
 Llanrhidian Lower 
 Llansamlet 
 Llwchwr (town) 
 Mawr 
 Morriston 
 Mumbles 
 Mynydd-bach 
 Penderry 
 Penllergaer 
 Pennard 
 Penrice 
 Pontarddulais (town) 
 Pontlliw and Tircoed 
 Port Eynon 
 Reynoldston 
 Rhossili 
 Sketty 
 St Thomas 
 Three Crosses (from 3 May 2012) 
 Townhill 
 Uplands 
 Upper Killay 
 Waterfront
 Waunarlwydd

Torfaen

 Abersychan 
 Blaenavon (town) 
 Croesyceiliog 
 Cwmbran Central 
 Fairwater 
 Henllys 
 Llantarnam 
 Llanyrafon 
 New Inn 
 Panteg 
 Pen Tranch 
 Ponthir 
 Pontnewydd 
 Pontymoile 
 Trevethin 
 Upper Cwmbran

Vale of Glamorgan

 Barry (town)  – see also Barry Town Council
 Colwinston 
 Cowbridge with Llanblethian (town) 
 Dinas Powys 
 Ewenny 
 Llancarfan 
 Llandough 
 Llandow 
 Llanfair 
 Llangan 
 Llanmaes
 Llantwit Major (town) 
 Michaelston-le-Pit and Leckwith 
 Penarth (town)  – see Penarth Town Council
 Pendoylan 
 Penllyn 
 Peterston-super-Ely 
 Rhoose 
 St Athan 
 St Bride's Major 
 St Donats 
 St Georges-super-Ely 
 St Nicholas and Bonvilston 
 Sully and Lavernock  
 Welsh St Donats 
 Wenvoe 
 Wick

Wrexham

 Abenbury 
 Acton 
 Bangor is-y-Coed 
 Bronington 
 Broughton 
 Brymbo 
 Caia Park 
 Cefn 
 Ceiriog Ucha 
 Chirk (town) 
 Coedpoeth 
 Erbistock 
 Esclusham 
 Glyntraian 
 Gresford 
 Gwersyllt 
 Hanmer 
 Holt 
 Isycoed 
 Llangollen Rural 
 Llansantffraid Glyn Ceiriog 
 Llay 
 Maelor South 
 Marchwiel 
 Minera 
 Offa 
 Overton 
 Penycae 
 Rhosddu 
 Rhosllanerchrugog 
 Rossett 
 Ruabon 
 Sesswick 
 Willington Worthenbury

Notes

See also

List of civil parishes in England
List of civil parishes in Scotland
List of community council areas in Scotland

References

External links
Geographical area listings > Administrative Geography > County listings — at the Office for National Statistics
A Vision of Britain through time — at VisionOfBritain.org uk
Election maps — at Ordnance Survey
Census 2001 — at Neighbourhood Statistics
Local Government Boundary Commission for Wales — at LGBC-Wales.gov.uk
Borough, Town & Community Councils — Blaenau Gwent County Borough Council
Town and Community Councils contact details — Bridgend County Borough Council
Community and Town Councils — Caerphilly County Borough Council
Cardiff Community councils — Cardiff Council
Town and Community Clerks — Carmarthenshire County Council
Town and Community Councils — Ceredigion County Council
Town and Community Councils — Conwy County Borough Council
Town and Community Councils — Denbighshire County Council
Town and Community Councils — Flintshire County Council
Community Councils — Cyngor Gwynedd
Town and Community Councils — Isle of Anglesey County Council
Community Council — Merthyr Tydfil County Borough Council
Town and Community Councils — Neath Port Talbot County Borough
Community Council Clerk contact details — City of Newport
Parish Councils — Pembrokeshire County Council
Town and Community Council Clerks details — Powys County Council
Community, Town Councils and Councillors — Rhondda Cynon Taf County Borough Council
Community and Town Councils — City and County of Swansea
Community Councils — Torfaen County Borough
Town and Community Councils — Vale of Glamorgan Council
Local Community Councils — Wrexham County Borough Council

 
Wales geography-related lists
Politics of Wales
 communities